UFC 221: Romero vs. Rockhold was a mixed martial arts event produced by the Ultimate Fighting Championship that was held on February 11, 2018, at Perth Arena in Perth, Western Australia.

Background
While the UFC has hosted 11 previous events across the country, the event marked the promotion's first visit to Perth, in Western Australia, after the state government overturned its ban on cage fighting.

In order for the event to be broadcast live during prime time hours on the east coast of North America, the main card began at 11:00 a.m. local time in Perth WST, with a full preliminary card beginning at approximately 7:00 a.m. local time.

While not officially announced by the promotion, a UFC Middleweight Championship unification bout between then champion Georges St-Pierre (who is also a former two time UFC Welterweight Champion) and interim champion Robert Whittaker (also The Ultimate Fighter: The Smashes welterweight winner), was initially targeted to serve as the event headliner. However, St-Pierre later indicated that he was currently mulling his future in the division and announced that he expected to be out indefinitely after being diagnosed with ulcerative colitis. Subsequently, St-Pierre vacated the championship on December 7 and Whittaker was promoted to undisputed champion. Whittaker was then expected to defend the championship against former Strikeforce and UFC Middleweight Champion Luke Rockhold in the main event. However, it was announced on January 13 that Whittaker pulled out of the bout and was replaced by former middleweight interim title challenger Yoel Romero, who was scheduled to face former WSOF Middleweight and Light Heavyweight Champion David Branch at UFC on Fox: Emmett vs. Stephens. The bout was also established as an interim title contest.

A lightweight bout between Jeremy Kennedy and Alexander Volkanovski was originally scheduled for UFC Fight Night: Werdum vs. Tybura. However, Kennedy pulled out due to a back injury. The pairing was later rescheduled for this event.

At the weigh-ins, Romero came in at 187.7 lb (after coming in at 188.3 lb in his first attempt), 2.7 pounds over the middleweight limit of 185 lb for a championship fight. As a result, in the event that Romero won the fight with Rockhold, he would be ineligible for the championship, while the latter was still eligible. Romero was fined 30% of his purse, which went to Rockhold and the bout proceeded as scheduled at a catchweight.

Results

Bonus awards 
The following fighters were awarded $50,000 bonuses:
Fight of the Night: Jake Matthews vs. Li Jingliang
Performance of the Night: Israel Adesanya and Jussier Formiga

See also

2018 in UFC
List of UFC events
List of current UFC fighters
Mixed martial arts in Australia

References

Ultimate Fighting Championship events
2018 in mixed martial arts
Mixed martial arts in Australia
Sport in Perth, Western Australia
2018 in Australian sport
UFC 221